Syllabus der Pflanzenfamilien (1892–) by Adolf Engler (1844–1930) is a complete revision of plant families down to generic level and often even further. As such it forms part of the Engler system of plant taxonomy.

Engler's starting point was that of Eichler who had been the first to use phylogenetic principles, and reflected the new post-Darwinian perspective, although Engler himself did not think that his was.  His modified Eichler schema first appeared in 1886 in his Guide to Breslau Botanic Garden (of which he was the director) and was expanded in his Syllabus in 1892. This reflected the new post-Darwinian perspective. Engler's Syllabus der Pflanzenfamilien first appeared in 1892 with the title Syllabus der Vorlesungen über specielle und medicinisch-pharmaceutische Botanik. Many subsequent editions have appeared since, and it was continued after Engler's death in 1930. The most recent edition was the 13th in 2009. A number of references to the Engler system actually refer to later revisions ('modified Engler system') undertaken by Melchior and colleagues, the 12th edition of the Syllabus, also referred to as the Melchior system.

Synopses

First edition (1892)

Review of previous systems p. xvii
Schema p. xx

 Myxothallophyta p. 1
 Myxomycetes
 Euthallophyta p. 3
 Schizophyta
 Dinoflagellata
 Bacillariales
 Gamophyceae
 Fungi
 Embryophyta Zoidiogama (Archegoniatae) 
 Bryophyta p. 43
 Pteridophyta p. 53
 Embryophyta Siphonogama (Phanerogamae)
 Gymnospermae p. 59
 Angiospermae p. 64
 Class Chalazogamae p. 64
 Class Acrogamae p. 65
  Subclass Monocotyledoneae 10 Orders
 1. Pandanales p. 65
 ...
 8. Liliiflorae p. 81
 9. Scitamineae p. 87
 10 Microspermae p. 89
 Subclass Dicotyledoneae 2 groups
 Group Archichlamydeae 23 orders
 1. Piperales p. 93
 ...
 19. Parietales p. 138 24 families
 ...
 Violaceae p. 142 
 ...
 20. Opuntiales p. 144
 ...
 23. Polygonales p. 101
 Group Sympetalae 9 Orders
 1. Ericales p. 151
 ...
 9. Campanulatae p. 173

Third edition (1903)
The main groups of plants are shown here with page numbers in (parentheses) and some corresponding volumes in Die Natürlichen Pflanzenfamilien in [square brackets], however there are changes between editions:

Review of previous systems p. xxi

From schema and index (pp. xxiv-xxv)

 I. Abteilung. Phytosarcodina, Myxothallophyta, Myxomycetes (p. 1)
 II. Abteilung. Schizophyta (p. 3) [vol 1 part Ia]
 III. Abteilung. Flagellatae (p. 6) [vol 1 part Ia]
 IV. Abteilung. Dinoflagellatae (p. 8)
 ? Abteilung. Silicoflagellatae (p. 8)
 V. Abteilung. Zygophyceae (p. 8)
 VI. Abteilung. Chlorophyceae (p. 11) [vol 1 part II]
 VII. Abteilung. Charales (p. 15)
 VIII. Abteilung. Phaeophyceae (p. 15)
 IX. Abteilung. Dictyotales (p. 18)
 X. Abteilung. Rhodophyceae (p. 18)
 XI. Abteilung. Eumycetes (Fungi) (p. 25) [vol 1 part I]
 XII. Abteilung. Embryophyta asiphonogama (Archegoniatae) (p. 50)
 I. Unterabteilung Bryophyta (Muscinei) (p. 51) [vol 1 part III: 1]
 II. Unterabteilung Pteridophyta (p. 61) [vol 1 part IV]
 XIII. Abteilung. Embryophyta siphonogama (Phanerogamae) (p. 70)
 I. Unterabteilung Gymnospermae (p. 70) [vol 2 part I]
 II. Unterabteilung Angiospermae (p. 75) [vol 2 part I]

XIII Embryophyta siphonogama 
 I. Unterabteilung Gymnospermae 6 classes (p. 70) [vol 2 part I]
 II. Unterabteilung Angiospermae 2 classes (p. 75) [vol 2 part I]
 1. Klasse Monocotyledoneae 11 orders (p. 76)
 2. Klasse Dicotyledoneae 2 subclasses (p. 106)

Gymnospermae 
6 classes (p. 70)

Angiospermae 
2 classes (p. 75)
 1. Klasse Monocotyledoneae 11 orders (p. 76) [vol 2 part I]
 2. Klasse Dicotyledoneae 2 sublasses (p. 106)

Monocotyledoneae 
11 orders
 1. Reihe Pandanales (p. 77)
 3. Reihe Triuridales (p. 80)
 4. Reihe Glumiflorae (p. 80)
 5. Reihe Principes (p. 84)
 6. Reihe Synanthae (p. 87)
 7. Reihe Spathiflorae (p. 87)
 8. Reihe Farinosae (p. 91)
 9. Reihe Liliiflorae (p. 93)  [vol 2 part I]
 10. Reihe Scitamineae (p. 101)
 11. Reihe Microspermae (p. 102)

Dicotyledoneae 
2 subclasses (p. 106)
 1. Unterklasse Archechlamydeae
 2. Unterklasse Metachlamydeae (Sympetalae) (p. 175)

Index (p. 215)

Monocotyledon family structure 
11 orders (Reihe)

Pandanales 
 Pandanaceae
 Sparganiaceae
 Typhaceae

Helobiae 
4 suborders
 subordo Alismatineae
 Alismataceae
 Butomaceae
 subordo Hydrocharitineae
 Hydrocharitaceae
 subordo Scheuchzeriineae
 Scheuchzeriaceae
 subordo Potamogetonineae
 Aponogetonaceae
 Juncaginaceae
 Potamogetonaceae
 Najadaceae
 Zannichelliaceae

Triuridales 
 Triuridaceae

Glumiflorae 
 Gramineae
 Maydeae
 Andropogoneae
 Paniceae
 Oryzeae
 Phalarideae
 Agrostideae
 Aveneae
 Festuceae
 Chlorideae
 Hordeeae
 Bambuseae
 Cyperaceae

Principes 
 Palmae or Arecaceae

Synanthae 
 Cyclanthaceae

Spathiflorae 
 Araceae
 Lemnaceae

Farinosae 
6 suborders
 Flagellariaceae
 Enantioblastae
 Bromellinewae
 Commelinineae
 Pontederiineae
 Philydrineae

Liliiflorae 
3 suborders (Unterreihe) 9 families
 p. 93
Juncineae  1 family (p. 94)
Liliineae  7 families (p. 94)
Iridineae  1 family (p. 100)

 suborder Juncineae (p. 94)
 Juncaceae
 subordo Liliineae  7 families (p. 94)
 Stemonaceae (p. 94)
 Liliaceae (p. 94) [pages 10–91]
 subfamilia Melanthioideae 6 tribes (p. 94)
 Tofieldieae
 Helonieae
 Veratreae
 Uvularieae
 Anguillarieae
 Colchiceae
 subfamilia  Herrerioideae (p. 95)
 subfamilia Asphodeloideae 8 tribes (p. 95)
 Asphodeleae
 Hemerocallideae
 Aloineae
 Aphyllantheae (p. 96)
 Johnsonieae
 Dasypogoneae
 Lomandreae
 Calectasieae
 subfamilia Allioideae 3 tribes(p. 96)
 Agapantheae
 Allieae
 Gilliesieae
 subfamilia Lilioideae 2 tribes (p. 96)
  Tulipeae 6 genera
  Scilleae 7 genera
 subfamilia Dracaenoideae 3 tribes (p. 97)
 subfamilia Asparagoideae 4 tribes (p. 97)
 subfamilia Ophiopogonoideae (p. 97)
 subfamilia Aletroideae (p. 98)
 subfamilia Luzuriagoideae (p. 98)
 subfamilia Smilacoideae (p. 98)
 Haemodoraceae (p. 98)
 Amaryllidaceae 3 subfamilies (p. 98)
 subfamilia Amaryllidoideae 2 tribes
 Amaryllideae (p. 98)
 Narcisseae (p. 99)
 subfamilia Agavoideae (p. 99)
 subfamilia Campynematoideae (p. 99)
 Velloziaceae (p. 99)
 Taccaceae (p. 99)
 Dioscoreaceae 2 tribes (p. 99)
 subordo Iridineae 2 families (p. 100)
 Iridaceae (p. 100)
 subfamilia Crocoideae
 subfamilia Iridoideae 3 tribes
 subfamilia Ixioideae 3 tribes

Scitamineae 
 Musaceae p. 101
 Zingiberaceae
 Cannaceae
 Marantaceae
 Lowiaceae p. 102

Microspermae 
 Orchidaceae

In modern classifications, Engler's divisions I - XI are not considered plants but are classified in other groups (although some botanists do accept Engler's divisions VII and VIII, the "green algae", as plants).

Thirteenth edition (2009-)

 Cyanoprokaryota [Part 1/1]
 Acrasia (Acrasiomycota) [Part 1/1]
 Eumycetozoa [Part 1/1]
 Protostelia 
 Dictyostelia
 Myxogastria (Myxomycetes)
 Phytomyxea (Plasmodiophoromycota) [Part 1/1]
 Fungi / Mycobionta
 Chytridiomycota [Part 1/1]
 Blastocladiomycetes
 Chytridiomycetes
 Monoblepharidomycetes
 Neocallimastigomycetes
 Zygomycota [Part 1/1]
 Entomophthoromycotina
 Mortierellomycotina
 Mucoromycotina
 Kickxellomycotina
 Zoopagomycotina
 Glomeromycota [Part 1/1]
 Glomeromycetes
 Ascomycota [Part 1/2, to be published]
 Basidiomycota [Part 1/3, to be published]
 Heterokontobionta
 Labyrinthulomycota [Part 1/1]
 Labyrinthulomycetes
 Oomycota [Part 1/1]
 Hyphochytridiomycetes
 Peronosporomycetes
 Cryptophyta [Part 2/1]
 Cryptophyceae
 Goniomonadea
 Dinophyta/Dinozoa (Dinoflagellata) [Part 2/1]
 Perkinsea
 Oxyrrhidophyceae
 Ellobiophyceae
 Syndiniophyceae
 Noctiluciphyceae
 Dinophyceae
 Haptophyta [Part 2/1]
 Pavlovophyceae
 Coccolithophyceae
 Heterokontophyta / Ochrophyta [Part 2/1]
 Diatomeae, Bacillariophyceae s.l.
 Coscinodiscophyceae
 Mediophyceae
 Fragilariophyceae
 Bacillariophyceae
 Other heterokontophytes
 Bolidophyceae
 Dictyochophyceae
 Pelagophyceae
 Pinguiophyceae
 Eustigmatophyceae
 Picophagea
 Synchromophyceae
 Chrysophyceae
 Raphidophyceae
 Chrysomerophyceae
 Aurearenophyceae
 Phaeothamniophyceae
 Xanthophyceae
 Schizocladiophyceae
 Phaeophyceae
 Glaucobionta [Part 2/1]
 Glaucophyta
 Rhodobionta [Part 2/2, to be published]
 Rhodophyta
 Organisation type "Green Algae"
 Chlorarachniophyta / Cercozoa [Part 2/1]
 Chlorarachniophyceae
 Euglenophyta/Euglenozoa [Part 2/1]
 Euglenophyceae
 Chlorobionta ("Viridiplantae") 
 Chlorophyta [Part 2/1]
 Nephroselmidophyceae
 Mamiellophyceae
 Prasinophyceae
 Pedinophyceae
 Chlorodendrophyceae
 Trebouxiophyceae
 Chlorophyceae
 Ulvophyceae
 Chlorophyta incertae sedis
 Palmophyllales
 Streptophyta 
 Mesostigmatophyceae [Part 2/1]
 Chlorokybophyceae [Part 2/1]
 Klebsormidiophyceae [Part 2/1]
 Coleochaetophyceae [Part 2/1]
 Zygnematophyceae [Part 2/1]
 Charophyceae [Part 2/1]
 Embryobionta 
 "Bryophytes" [Part 3]
 Marchantiophyta (Hepaticae) 
 Bryophyta (Musci)
 Anthocerotophyta
 Polysporangiomorpha [Part 3]
 "Protracheophytes" (Horneophytopsida)
 Tracheophyta
 Rhyniophytina [Part 3]
 Lycophytina [Part 3]
 Euphyllophytina [Part 3]
 “Trimerophytina”
 Moniliformopses (Cladoxylopsida, Psilotopsida, Equisetopsida, Marattiopsida, Polypodiopsida)
 Radiatopses (Progymnospermopsida)
 Spermatophytina
 Pinopsida (gymnosperms) [Part 4, to be published]
 Magnoliopsida (angiosperms)
 Magnoliidae [Part 4, to be published]
 Lilianae (monocotyledons)
 Acorales, Alismatales, Petrosaviales, Dioscoreales, Pandanales, Liliales, Asparagales [Part 4, to be published]
 Arecales, Commelinales, Poales, Zingiberales, Dasypogonales [Part 5, to be published]
 Eudicotyledons [Part 5, to be published]

References

Bibliography

Works by Engler

Syllabus editions 1892–1924 

 
 
 
 
 1904: Engler, A. idem, 4th ed., Borntraeger, Berlin.
 1907: Engler, A. idem, 5th ed., Gebrüder Borntraeger Verlag, Berlin, 247 p.
 1909: Engler, A. idem, 6th ed., Gebrüder Borntraeger Verlag, Berlin, 254 p.
 1912: Engler, A. & E. Gilg, Syllabus der Pflanzenfamilien: eine Übersicht über das gesamte Pflanzensystem mit besonderer Berücksichtigung der Medizinal- und Nutzpflanzen, nebst einer Übersicht über die Florenreiche und Florengebiete der Erde zum Gebrauch bei Vorlesungen und Studien über spezielle und medizinisch-pharmazeutische Botanik, 7th ed., Gebrüder Borntraeger Verlag, Berlin, 387 p.
 
 1924: Engler, A. & E. Gilg, Syllabus der Pflanzenfamilien: eine Übersicht über das ganze Pflanzensystem mit besonderer Berücksichtigung der Medizinal- und Naturpflanzen nebst einer Übersicht über die Florenreiche und Florengebiete der Erde zum Gebrauch bei Vorlesungen und Studien über spezielle und medizinisch-pharmazeutische Botanik , 9th ed., Gebrüder Borntraeger Verlag, Berlin, 420 p.
 1924: Engler, A. & E. Gilg, idem, 10th ed., Gebrüder Borntraeger Verlag, Berlin.

Posthumous editions 

 1936: Diels, L. A. Engler's Syllabus der Pflanzenfamilien: eine Übersicht über das ganze Pflanzensystem mit besonderer Berücksichtigung der Medizinal- und Nutzpflanzen nebst einer Übersicht über die Florenreiche und Florengebiete der Erde zum Gebrauch bei Vorselungen und Studien über spezielle und medizinisch-pharmazeutische Botanik, 11th ed., Gebrüder Borntraeger Verlag, Berlin, 419 p.
 
 Vol. I 367 pp.
 Vol. II 666 pp.
 1983: Gerloff, J. & K. Walther, idem, 13th ed., Gebrüder Borntraeger Verlag, Berlin (Only one of seven planned volumes was published - Bryophytina, Laubmoose) 
 In 2009, the edition was revived, with the publication of the first of five replanned volumes
  
  
  
  Google Books
 
 Forthcoming parts:
 Part 1/3: Basidiomycota
 Part 2/2: Rhodobionta
 Part 5: Seed Plants, Spermatophytes (2)

Other works by Engler

Works about Engler

External links 
 Synopsis sixth ed. Syllabus

Botany books